= Musawenkosi Saurombe =

Zimbabwean professor

Musawenkosi Donia Saurombe
- Born: Musawenkosi Donia Saurombe
- Education: North West University, University of Johannesburg, University of the Free State
- Occupation: Professor
- Employer: University of Johannesburg

Musawenkosi Donia Saurombe is a Zimbabwean professor of industrial psychology. In 2017, at 23 years old, she became the youngest female to receive a PhD in Africa.

== Education ==
Musawenkosi Saurombe was homeschooled by her mother from an early stage, which assisted during her primary and high school career. She obtained her high school certificate at the age of 15 from Legae Academy High School. She obtained her bachelor's degree at age 19, and her doctorate in industrial psychology at age 23, both at North-West University, in South Africa.

== Career ==
Saurombe served as a postdoctoral research fellow at North-West University, and was later a senior lecturer at the University of the Free State, in Bloemfontein. In 2021, she was employed at the University of Johannesburg as a senior lecturer, and became an associate professor in 2022. At some point, she was an ambassador for higher education in Botswana.

== Awards and scholarships ==
In 2017, she was named the Emerging Psychologist of the Year, by the Society for Industrial and Organizational Psychology of South Africa. In 2018, she received the BRICS International Forum award of honour in New Delhi, India. In the same year, she was named the CEO IPM Youth Leader.

== Publications ==
- Ngobeni, D.A., Saurombe, M.D., & Joseph, R.M. (2022). The influence of the psychological contract on employee engagement in a South African bank. Frontiers in Psychology-Organizational Psychology.
- Zinatsa, F., & Saurombe, M.D. (2022). A framework for the labor market integration of female accompanying spouses in South Africa. South African Journal of Industrial Psychology.
- Zinatsa, F., & Saurombe, M.D. (2022). Self-governing strategies of tied migrants in the South African labor market. Journal of Global Business and Technology, 18(1), 40-55.
- Zinatsa, F., & Saurombe, M.D. (2022). Tied Migrant Labor Market Integration: deconstructing labor market subjectivities in South Africa. Frontiers in Psychology-Gender, Sex and Sexualities.
- Saurombe, M.D., & Barkhuizen, E.N. (2022). Talent Management Practices and Work-related Outcomes for South African Academic Staff. Journal of Psychology in Africa, 32(1).
- Shingenge, S.N., & Saurombe, M.D. (2022). Leadership Mindset Regarding Talent Management Practices: A Case Study of Windhoek City Council. South African Journal of Human Resource Management, 20.
- Swanepoel, K., & Saurombe, M.D. (2022). The significance of an employee value proposition in the retention of teachers at selected South African private schools. South African Journal of Economic and Management Sciences, 25(1).
- Magagula, K., Maziriri, E., & Saurombe, M. (2020). Am I ready for the job market? Navigating on the precursors of work readiness among students in Johannesburg. SA Journal of Industrial Psychology, 46(11).
- Saurombe, MD., & Barkhuizen, E.N. (2020). A Talent Value Proposition Framework for Academic Staff in a South African HEI. Journal of Global Business and Technology, 16(2), 85-102.
